Charaun Jareé "C. J." Goodwin (born February 4, 1990) is an American football cornerback for the Dallas Cowboys of the National Football League (NFL). He was signed by the Pittsburgh Steelers as an undrafted free agent following the 2014 NFL Draft. He played college football at Bethany College, Fairmont State, and California (PA).

Early life and family
Goodwin was born on February 4, 1990, in Wheeling, West Virginia, to Yvette Goodwin-Rowe and Galloway. He attended The Linsly School in Wheeling, West Virginia, and began playing football until his senior year. He was a starter at wide receiver. In addition to football, he also competed in track and basketball.

College career

Bethany College
After graduating from high school, Goodwin attended Bethany College. He would play basketball for Bethany for two seasons and transferred after his sophomore year.

Fairmont State University
Following his departure from Bethany, Goodwin would enroll in Fairmont State University for his junior year. After his arrival, he played in an intramural basketball game against the school's football staff. At the urging of his father, the late Perry Galloway, Jr., and his college roommate, future NFL player Dewey McDonald he eventually joined the Fighting Falcons football team.

In his first game against Clarion he would make 6 catches for 56 yards. On September 22, Goodwin would amass 3 catches, 104 yards, and make an 83-yard touchdown catch in a game against West Liberty University (during a game against his first cousin Daree' Goodwin). While matching up against West Virginia Wesleyan, he would reel in three receptions, 55 receiving yards, and a career-high two touchdowns. In the next game against Seton Hill, Goodwin would score on a 31-yard reception. On November 10, he made a career-high seven catches for 141 receiving yards in a win against Shepherd.

After walking on his first year and having a successful season he was offered a scholarship to continue playing for Fairmont. Head coach Mike Lopez would be fired after Goodwin's first year playing for Fairmont and accepted a defensive coordinator position with California University of Pennsylvania. Goodwin finished the 2012 season third on the team with 24 receptions and 440 receiving yards. He also led the team with 18.3 yards per a catch and finished the season with 4 touchdown receptions.

California University of Pennsylvania
After the departure of Fairmont's head coach, Goodwin would transfer to California University of Pennsylvania to continue playing wide receiver for his former head coach Mike Lopez. Since he already graduated from Fairmont, he was able to begin playing immediately, instead of sitting out a year due to NCAA student transfer guidelines.

Goodwin would make his first touchdown reception of the 2013 season against Kutztown. In a game against IUP, he made two receptions for 16 yards. While playing Gannon, he made three receptions for 40 receiving yards. Against Millersville, he ended with a season-high four catches and 49 yards. Since he mainly saw action on special teams, he only finished his senior season at Cal-Pennsylvania with a total of 11 receptions, 126 receiving yards, and one touchdown in 11 games and one start.

Professional career

Pittsburgh Steelers
After finishing his collegiate career, Goodwin would enter the 2014 NFL Draft. He was a virtually unknown prospect due to him playing at two NCAA Division II schools and he was thought to be a raw player, but also had good size and measurables to play wide receiver. Although he wasn't invited to the official NFL Combine held annually in Indianapolis, he still had good showing at a pre-draft combine held by the Detroit Lions.

After going undrafted and not receiving any interest as an undrafted free agent immediately after the draft, Goodwin finally received a tryout with the Pittsburgh Steelers after Mel Blount urged them to give him an opportunity. He had attended the same high school as Blount's son and worked for Blount as a farmhand for seven years. On June 4, 2014, he signed an undrafted rookie free agent contract with the Steelers, for three-years and $1.53 million. He was released on August 26. He was added to the practice squad five days later. He signed a reserve/futures contract on January 5, 2015.

On August 31, 2015, Goodwin was waived by the Steelers.

Atlanta Falcons
On November 3, 2015, Goodwin was signed to the Atlanta Falcons practice squad.

Goodwin signed a reserve/futures contract with the Atlanta Falcons on January 5, 2016. During the Falcons training camp in 2016, he converted from a wide receiver to a cornerback.  In 2016, he played in 14 games with one start, recording 7 defensive tackles, 2 passes defensed and 10 special teams tackles. Goodwin and the Falcons reached Super Bowl LI on February 5, 2017. Against the New England Patriots, the Falcons fell in a 34–28 overtime defeat. He recorded 2 defensive tackles and one special teams tackle in the game.

In 2017, Goodwin played in 12 games, making 5 defensive tackles and 3 special teams tackles, before being waived on December 14, 2017.

Arizona Cardinals
On December 15, 2017, Goodwin was claimed off waivers by the Arizona Cardinals. He played in the final two games of the season and had one special teams tackle.

On May 1, 2018, Goodwin was released by the Cardinals.

New York Giants
On May 2, 2018, Goodwin was claimed off waivers by the New York Giants. He was waived by the Giants on May 14.

San Francisco 49ers
On May 15, 2018, Goodwin was claimed off waivers by the San Francisco 49ers. He was waived on July 31, 2018.

Cincinnati Bengals
On August 4, 2018, Goodwin signed with the Cincinnati Bengals. He was waived on September 1, 2018, and was signed to the practice squad the next day.

Dallas Cowboys
On October 9, 2018, Goodwin was signed by the Dallas Cowboys off the Bengals practice squad. He was placed on injured reserve on October 26, after undergoing surgery for a broken forearm. On December 24, he was activated off injured reserve, to play gunner on special teams and improve the coverage units. He played in two games, before being sidelined for 8 contests with a broken arm, returning for the season finale and the playoffs. He finished the season with one special teams tackle.

In 2019, Goodwin appeared in 16 games for the first time in his career, registering 2 defensive tackles and 10 special teams tackles (led the team). He had 3 special teams tackles against the Chicago Bears.

On March 30, 2020, Goodwin re-signed with the Cowboys. He was released during final roster cuts on September 5, 2020, but was re-signed two days later. In Week 2 against his former team, the Atlanta Falcons, Goodwin recovered an onside kick with less than two minutes left in the game to set up the game winning field goal of the improbable 40–39 comeback win. The play came to be known as the 'watermelon' kick. In Week 16, he had a key role in the 37-17 win against the Philadelphia Eagles, where he was used as a spy defender, to help neutralize the running of rookie quarterback Jalen Hurts.

On March 19, 2021, Goodwin re-signed with the Cowboys on a two-year contract.

Philanthropy/Causes
Goodwin founded the PeGa Foundation (Perry Galloway, Jr. Foundation) to honor his late father/mentor after his passing. The PeGa Foundation is a nonprofit mentoring organization based out of his hometown in  Wheeling, West Virginia. Off the field, he spends most of his free time mentoring youth of PeGa and volunteering his time by speaking to schools and youth groups across the country.

Personal life
Goodwin has 3 children, a son and 2 daughters.

References 

1990 births
Living people
Players of American football from West Virginia
American football wide receivers
American football cornerbacks
African-American players of American football
Bethany Bison football players
Fairmont State Fighting Falcons football players
California Vulcans football players
Sportspeople from Wheeling, West Virginia
Pittsburgh Steelers players
Atlanta Falcons players
Arizona Cardinals players
New York Giants players
San Francisco 49ers players
Cincinnati Bengals players
Dallas Cowboys players
21st-century African-American sportspeople